Tenodera fasciata is a species of mantis in the family Mantidae.

Range
Indonesia, Philippines and Okinawa(Ryukyu).

Subspecies
There were once two subspecies of Tenodera fasciata, but Tenodera blanchardi (Giglio-Tos, 1912) was elevated to full species status by Tindale.  The nominate and now sole subspecies has several synonyms:

Tenodera fasciata attenuata (Stoll, 1813)
Tenodera fasciata exsiccata (Serville, 1839)
Tenodera fasciata leptelytra (Lichtenstein, 1802)

References

Mantidae
Insects of Indonesia
Insects described in 1792